Zombies Paradise is a 2006 cover album by the Leningrad Cowboys.

Track listing

Personnel
The Leningrad Cowboys:
Tipe Johnson – vocals
Sakke Järvenpää – vocals
Jay Kortehisto – Trombone, vocals
Marzi Nyman – Guitar, vocals (lead vocals on track 10)
Pemo Ojala – trumpet, vocals
Petri Puolitaival – Tenor sax, vocals
Mauri Sumén – keyboards, accordion, vocals
Timo Tolonen – Bass, vocals
Tume Uusitalo – Guitar, vocals
Varre Vartiainen – guitar, vocals

Additional musicians:
Johanna Försti – backing vocals on tracks 1,3,4,7-9,11
Marika Tuhkala – backing vocals on tracks 1,3,7-9,11
LoLife – rap and additional programming on track 5
Aake Kalliala – laughter on track 12

Additional choir arrangements on tracks 1,3,11 by Mauri Sumén. Performed by Controes Minores conducted by Hannu Norjanen

Singles

"Der Lachende Vagabund"

CD Leningrad Cowboys Ltd/ LCPROMO (Finland) [promo]
"Der Lachende Vagabund"
"Pretty Fly (For a White Guy)" [live]
"Kashmir" [live]

You're My Heart, You're My Soul"

CD Sony BMG/82876842532 (Finland)
"You're My Heart, You're My Soul" - 3:31
"Happy Together (2006)" - 2:55
"Happy Together (Original)" - 2:49
 Feat, The Alexandrov Red Army Ensemble

References

2006 albums
Leningrad Cowboys albums
Covers albums